Siegfried Dessauer (1874–1956) was a German screenwriter and film director. As a Jew he was expelled from the Nazi Reich Chamber of Film in 1938. Until February 1945 he lived in Wittenau, then moved to Hermsdorf. After the Second World War he emigrated to Australia in 1947.

Selected filmography
 Hotel Atlantik (1920)
 Shame (1922)
 The Captain from Koepenick (1926)

References

Bibliography
 Prawer, S.S. Between Two Worlds: The Jewish Presence in German and Austrian Film, 1910-1933. Berghahn Books, 2005.

External links

Film people from Berlin
1874 births
1956 deaths
19th-century German Jews
German emigrants to Australia